Bateman Island is an island located on the Columbia River immediately east of the Yakima River Delta between the cities of Richland and Kennewick, Washington, in the United States. Bateman Island was formerly known as Riverview Island.

History
Lewis and Clark mentioned Bateman Island in their journals in 1805. William Clark and two other men made their way towards the mouth of the Yakima River, but due to the time the farthest they got was Bateman Island.

Lewis and Clark never made it past Bateman Island; it was the furthest upstream they traveled on the Columbia.

In 1872 the island was being used for wheat farming, and in 1912 it was used for raising cows. The causeway that connects the island to the shore was completed sometime around 1940. From 1941 to 1952 the Batemans used the island to raise turkeys and for farming.

The island has suffered damage from wildfire periodically, most recently in August 2001 and July 2017. In both cases, the fires were caused by human activity and led to extended closures of the island to visitation.

In 2002 thanks to support by Bechtel Hanford and with help from many volunteers, about 27 tons worth of beer cans and other debris left there over the last 60 years was removed.

Attractions 
Presently, the island is open to the public for numerous activities. Evidence of the recent fires is apparent, though the vegetation is rebounding quickly. The island is home to many different species of wildlife, including deer, birds, carp in the wet season, and numerous small animals. Common recreational activities include fishing, bird watching, and hiking. The island also has multiple geocaches on it.

See also
Clover Island

References 

 More on the background of Bateman island and relation to Lewis & Clark
 A short description of the wildfire that plagued Bateman island in 2001

Landforms of Benton County, Washington
Islands of the Columbia River in Washington (state)
Uninhabited islands of Washington (state)